Richard L. Frymire (born January 4, 1931) was an American politician in the state of Kentucky. He served in the Kentucky Senate and in the Kentucky House of Representatives, as a Democrat. He also served as Adjutant General of Kentucky from 1971 to 1977. He retired at the rank of major general.

References

1931 births
Living people
Democratic Party members of the Kentucky House of Representatives
Democratic Party Kentucky state senators
Politicians from Louisville, Kentucky
State cabinet secretaries of Kentucky